Maungakotukutuku is a rural locality on the Kapiti Coast of New Zealand's North Island. It is located inland, behind Paraparaumu and Raumati.

The Maungakōtukutuku Stream and Wharemauku Stream both have their headwaters in the Maungakotukutuku area. Maungakotukutuku Valley has been considered as a possible site for a dam to boost the Kapiti Coast's water supply.  The hilly areas, often called "the Maungatooks" by locals, have tracks popular with trampers, mountain and dirt bikers, and horse riders.

Demographics

Maungakotukutuku had a population of 1,335 at the 2018 New Zealand census, an increase of 123 people (10.1%) since the 2013 census, and an increase of 291 people (27.9%) since the 2006 census. There were 486 households. There were 672 males and 663 females, giving a sex ratio of 1.01 males per female. The median age was 50.3 years (compared with 37.4 years nationally), with 189 people (14.2%) aged under 15 years, 195 (14.6%) aged 15 to 29, 693 (51.9%) aged 30 to 64, and 261 (19.6%) aged 65 or older.

Ethnicities were 93.9% European/Pākehā, 6.7% Māori, 1.3% Pacific peoples, 2.7% Asian, and 2.9% other ethnicities (totals add to more than 100% since people could identify with multiple ethnicities).

The proportion of people born overseas was 30.1%, compared with 27.1% nationally.

Although some people objected to giving their religion, 56.6% had no religion, 34.4% were Christian, 0.2% were Muslim, 0.7% were Buddhist and 2.0% had other religions.

Of those at least 15 years old, 342 (29.8%) people had a bachelor or higher degree, and 138 (12.0%) people had no formal qualifications. The median income was $35,700, compared with $31,800 nationally. The employment status of those at least 15 was that 558 (48.7%) people were employed full-time, 192 (16.8%) were part-time, and 33 (2.9%) were unemployed.

References 

Populated places in the Wellington Region
Kapiti Coast District